The 2020 Ice Hockey World Junior Championships (2020 WJC) was the 44th edition of the Ice Hockey World Junior Championship. It began on December 26, 2019, and ended with the gold medal game being played on January 5, 2020. Canada defeated Russia 4–3 to win the gold medal and their 18th world junior hockey championship. This marks the fourth time that the Czech Republic hosted the WJHC.

On April 16, 2018, it was announced that Ostrava and Třinec, in the Moravian-Silesian Region in the northeast corner of the Czech Republic, would be the host cities. It is the second time that Ostrava has been the primary host of the tournament and the first time that Třinec is hosting in any capacity. Ostrava has also twice co-hosted the senior Ice Hockey World Championships.

Top Division

Venues

Officials
The following officials were assigned by the International Ice Hockey Federation to officiate the 2020 World Junior Championships.

Referees
  Michael Campbell
  Ivan Fateev
  Andreas Harnebring
  Lassi Heikkinen
  Oldřich Hejduk
  Fraser Lawrence
  Sean MacFarlane
  Sergey Morozov
  Vladimír Pešina
  André Schrader
  Michael Tscherrig
  Kristian Vikman

Linesmen
  Riley Bowles
  Markus Hägerström
  Chad Huseby
  Vít Lederer
  Ludvig Lundgren
  Jonas Merten
  Tobias Nordlander
  David Obwegeser
  Nikita Shalagin
  Šimon Synek

Seeding
The seedings in the preliminary round are based on the 2019 tournament's final standings using the serpentine system. On 6 January 2019, the IIHF announced the groups. With Germany being promoted from Division I A after winning the  2019 Division I A Tournament. 

Group A (Třinec)
 (1)
 (4)
 (5)
 (8)
 (9)

Group B (Ostrava)
 (2)
 (3)
 (6)
 (7)
 (11-Promoted)

Rosters

Format
The preliminary round is a two group of five teams each internal round-robin format, followed by a three-round playoff. In the round-robin, three points are allotted for a regulation win, and two points for an overtime or shootout win. One point is allotted for an overtime or shootout loss.

The four highest-ranked teams from each group of the preliminary round advance to the quarterfinals while the last-place team from each group will play a best-of-three series, the loser relegated to Division IA for 2021, being replaced by the winner of Division IA. All other teams will retain their Top Division status for the 2021 edition.

Preliminary round
All times are local (UTC+1).

Group A

Group B

Relegation

Playoff round
Winning teams were reseeded for the semi-finals in accordance with the following ranking, this was a change the IIHF implemented during their 2019 annual congress. To determine this ranking, the following criteria were used in the order presented:
higher position in the group
higher number of points
better goal difference
higher number of goals scored for
better seeding coming into the tournament (final placement at the 2019 World Junior Ice Hockey Championships).

Bracket

Quarterfinals

Semifinals

Bronze medal game

Final

Statistics

Scoring leaders 

GP = Games played; G = Goals; A = Assists; Pts = Points; +/− = Plus-minus; PIM = Penalties In MinutesSource: IIHF

Goaltending leaders 

(minimum 40% team's total ice time)

TOI = Time on ice (minutes:seconds); GA = Goals against; GAA = Goals against average; SA = Shots against; Sv% = Save percentage; SO = ShutoutsSource: IIHF

Final standings

Awards
Best players selected by the directorate:
Best Goaltender:  Joel Hofer
Best Defenceman:  Rasmus Sandin
Best Forward:  Alexis Lafrenière
Source: IIHF

Media All-Stars:
MVP:  Alexis Lafrenière
Goaltender:  Joel Hofer
Defencemen:  Rasmus Sandin /  Alexander Romanov
Forwards:  Samuel Fagemo /  Barrett Hayton /  Alexis Lafrenière
Source: IIHF

Division I

Group A
The tournament was held in Minsk, Belarus from 9 to 15 December 2019.

Group B
The tournament was held in Kyiv, Ukraine from 12 to 18 December 2019.

Division II

Group A
The tournament was held in Vilnius, Lithuania from 6 to 12 January 2020.

Group B
The tournament was held in Gangneung, South Korea from 28 January to 3 February 2020.

Division III

The tournament was held in Sofia, Bulgaria from 13 to 19 January 2020.

References

Links
  IIHF World Juniors Official Site
  World Juniors IIHF

 
2020
World Junior Championships
World Junior Championships
World Junior Championships, 2020
World Junior Championships, 2020
Sport in Ostrava
Sport in Třinec
World Junior Ice Hockey Championships
World Junior Ice Hockey Championships
2019–20 in Czech ice hockey